Neoeme is a genus of beetles in the family Cerambycidae, containing the following species:

 Neoeme annulicornis (Buquet, 1859)
 Neoeme bouvieri Gounelle, 1909
 Neoeme hudepohli (Martins & Monné, 1975)
 Neoeme opaca Zajciw, 1958
 Neoeme pallida (Buquet, 1859)
 Neoeme quinquelineata Zajciw, 1958

References

Xystrocerini